The Politics of Envy is the seventh album by British singer Mark Stewart, released on 26 March 2012 through Future Noise.

Track listing

Personnel 
Martin Glover – production, mixing
Mark Stewart – vocals, production, mixing

References

External links 
 

2012 albums
Mark Stewart (English musician) albums
Albums produced by Youth (musician)